The Philip H. Iselin Stakes is an American Thoroughbred horse race held annually at Monmouth Park Racetrack in Oceanport, New Jersey. Open to horses three years of age and older, the race was first run in 1884. In 1891, New Jersey state legislators began a move to ban parimutuel betting and the race had to be moved to the Jerome Park Racetrack and the Morris Park Racetrack in The Bronx, New York. With a legislated permanent ban, after the 1893 running the Monmouth Park Racetrack was shut down and the property sold. In 1946 Thoroughbred racing returned to a new Monmouth Park facility, spurred on by the burgeoning American economy after the end of World War II.

From inception until 1966 the race was known as the Monmouth Handicap; then from 1967 through 1980 it was run as the Amory L. Haskell Handicap. In 1981 it reverted to the Monmouth Handicap name, then in 1986, it was given its present name to honor Philip H. Iselin, a founding shareholder and director of the Monmounth Park Racetrack who would serve as its president and chairman of the Board of directors.

Created in the 19th century, when most Thoroughbred horse races were run at much longer distances than they are today, the early Monmouth Handicaps were raced over a distance of  miles. 

The Philip Iselin Stakes is the second leg of the Mid Atlantic Thoroughbred Championships Long Dirt Division or MATCh Races. MATCh is a series of five races in five separate thoroughbred divisions run throughout four Mid-Atlantic States including; Pimlico Race Course and Laurel Park Racecourse in Maryland; Delaware Park Racetrack in Delaware; Parx, Philadelphia Park and Presque Isle Downs in Pennsylvania and Monmouth Park in New Jersey.

Records
Time record (since 1979):
  miles: 1:46.80  by Spend a Buck (1985), Jolie's Halo (1992)
  miles: 1:40.20 Formal Gold (1997)

Most wins:
 2  – West Coast Scout (1972, 1973)

Most wins by a jockey: 
 4 – Eddie Arcaro (1956, 1957, 1958, 1960)
 4 – Bill Shoemaker (1959,1979, 1980, 1986)

Most wins by a trainer: 
 3 – James E. Fitzsimmons (1954, 1956, 1958)
 3 – David Jacobson (2014, 2016, 2018)
Most wins by an owner:

 2 – David Jacobson (2016, 2018)
 2 – Oxford Stable (1972, 1973)
 2 – James Ben Ali Haggin (1886, 1888)

Winners

References

Graded stakes races in the United States
Horse races in New Jersey
Open mile category horse races
Recurring sporting events established in 1884
Monmouth Park Racetrack
1884 establishments in New Jersey